My Shining Hour (released 2001 in Oslo, Norway by label Blue Jersey Records – BJCD 02) is a Jazz album by the Norwegian jazz singer Kjersti Stubø Band.

Review 
With this stylistic debut album as a solo artist, Stubø has chosen to go her own ways and seek  her musical roots in jazz standard material.

Track listing 
«If I Should Lose You» (3:44)
«My Shining Hour» (3:36)
«My Foolish Heart» (5:22)
«I'm Old Fashioned» (3:18)
«It Could Happen To You» (3:58)
«Angel Eyes» (4:18)
«Blame It On My Youth» (5:52)
«It's Allright With Me» (3:50)
«I Could Never Fool You» (2:59)
«My One And Only Love» (3:14)

Musicians 
Kjersti Stubø - vocals
Anders Bergcrantz - trumpet & flugelhorn
Vigleik Storaas - piano
Per Oddvar Johansen - drums
Olaf Kamfjord - double bass

Production 
Engineer – Jan Erik Kongshaug
Producer – Kjersti Stubø

References 

2011 albums
Kjersti Stubø albums